Peter Dibben (born 1991) is a British track cyclist.

His younger brother Jonathan Dibben rides for UCI WorldTeam .

Cycling career
Dibben became a British team champion when winning the Team Pursuit Championship at the 2011 British National Track Championships.

References

1991 births
Living people
British male cyclists
British track cyclists
21st-century British people